Pré-Saint-Gervais is a station of the Paris Métro, serving as the eastern terminus (actually the far end of the terminal loop) of line 7bis, in the 19th arrondissement. It is named after the district of Pré-Saint-Gervais, which was part of the commune of Le Pré-Saint-Gervais before it was absorbed into Paris in 1860. Le Pré-Saint-Gervais is named after a chapel dedicated to Saint Gervasius.

History 
The station opened on 18 January 1911 as part of a branch of line 7 from Louis Blanc to Pré-Saint-Gervais, 18 days after the commissioning of the first section of line 7 between Opéra and Porte de la Villette due to difficulties during its construction. It then served as the terminus of the two northeastern branches of line 7. From 27 November 1921 to 2 September 1939, a shuttle service operated between the station and the former Porte des Lilas - Cinéma via a tunnel called voie navette. On 3 December 1967 this branch was separated from line 7, becoming line 7bis. It serves as the commercial terminus of line 7bis and trains may stop for an extended period of time as breaks for drivers as well as for timetabling reasons.

As part of the "Un métro + beau" programme by the RATP, the station was renovated and modernised on 2 May 2006.

In 2019, the station was used by 365,930 passengers, making it the 301st busiest of the Métro network out of 302 stations.

In 2020, the station was used by 226,935 passengers amidst the COVID-19 pandemic, making it the 300th busiest of the Métro network out of 305 stations.

Passenger services

Access
The station has a single exit at boulevard Sérurie and is adorned with a Guimard entrance. It was listed as a historical monument on 12 February 2016.

Station layout

Platforms
The station has a single island platform flanked by 2 tracks with only the southern platform in commercial use. The northern platform, however, is largely isolated behind technical rooms and is used to store trains as well as to serve as a maintenance workshop.

Other connections
The station is also served by tramway 3b at the nearby Hôpital Robert-Debré since 15 December 2012 along with line 48 and the P’tit Bus of the RATP bus network.

Nearby 

 Hôpital Robert-Debré
 Parc de la Butte-du-Chapeau-Rouge

Gallery

References

Roland, Gérard (2003). Stations de métro. D’Abbesses à Wagram. Éditions Bonneton.

Paris Métro line 7bis
Paris Métro stations in the 19th arrondissement of Paris
Railway stations in France opened in 1911